The Laigh Kirk is a church in Kilmarnock, East Ayrshire, Scotland.

History
The current church, the third on the site, was built in 1802. The first church was built in the 17th century and was replaced in 1750.

By 1801, the building was too small to accommodate the large congregation. The passageways and stairs were small and very narrow. The stability of the building had been called into question and there was a local belief in a prophecy that the building was destined to fall down on to the congregation.
 
On Sunday 18 October 1801, the congregation was unusually large, as churches in neighbouring parishes were vacant, and many had flocked to the Laigh to hear "Great McKinlay", the preacher. As the minister was about to enter the church, a small piece of plaster fell from the ceiling. A cry went up that the building was falling down, panic ensued and the congregation started to rush outside. Those upstairs became tightly jammed together, many fell, crushing and suffocating those poor souls underneath them. Some were crushed against the inward-opening doors at the foot of the stairs. Some desperate people threw themselves from the gallery into body of the kirk, others leapt from windows into the graveyard. 29 people were killed in the stampede and another died soon after. The church was quickly torn down and the current, more spacious church was built the following year.

References

See also
Robert Stirling

Church of Scotland churches in Scotland
Buildings and structures in Kilmarnock
Category A listed buildings in East Ayrshire
Listed churches in Scotland
Churches completed in 1802
19th century in Scotland